Alex van der Zouwen (born 1 July 1986, Rozenburg), better known by his stage name Kraantje Pappie, is a Dutch rapper and television presenter. Van der Zouwen is signed to the label Noah's Ark, which released four major albums alongside several singles.

Early and personal life
Van der Zouwen is a Dutch/Moluccan rapper, who grew up in Rozenburg near Rotterdam and followed an education in Zuidlaren and Groningen. He lived in Haarlem for a while because of his successful judo career. In 2016, van der Zouwen participated in the 17th season of the reality show, Expeditie Robinson. He left after feeling homesick and not having finished his album Crane III. On the 10th of february 2021, Van der Zouwen became a father to his daughter Maeve Celine van der Zouwen.

Music 

The name Kraantje Pappie comes from a website that generates native american names. The name for Van der Zouwen was Kraantje Pappie. In 2007 he started gaining more recognition from the hiphop-community by releasing mixtapes and performing. In 2007, Van der Zouwen, won the Before the Fame Awards hosted in Groningen which started his career as a rapper. He made his breakthrough in 2012 with his debutalbum Crane. The album distinguished itself by using Van der Zouwen's rhyming technique in combination with dubstep- and grimeproductions. The album was produced by a group called Noisia.

In the beginning of May 2015 Van der Zouwen released three new albums, of which one he send to a fan whose address he knew. It is a trilogy, called Guardians van the Real Shit. On these three albums there are a total 39 tracks and collaborations with different artists, such as Jan Smit (singer), Dope D.O.D, Jiggy Djé and Boef en de Gelogeerde Aap. These albums were also free to download for a week.

Van der Zouwen released in 2012 and 2014 the first two parts of the trilogy Crane. On October 28th in 2016 he released the third part of the trilogy, which in September 2017 won him a gold record. Van der Zouwen also received golden record for, among others the singles Waar is Kraan?, Feesttent, Handen omhoog and De manier. In 2017 he scored a massive hit in Flanders with the single Pompen.

On September 28th of 2018, the album Daddy was released, of which the single Lil Craney was rewarded with a platinum record for selling more than 160,000 records. The single Liefde in de lucht (in collaboration with Chef'Special-singer Joshua Nolet) also grew out to be a top 10 hit.

Van der Zouwen as of March 2021 part of a group of musicians named The Streamers, who gave free livestream-concerts during the COVID-19 pandemic. After the corona measures where loosened, the group announced to perform in concerts with an audience.

Television 
In 2013 Van der Zouwen made his debut as television presenter and presented with Geraldine Kemper the second season of the show 101Barz The Next MC. Afterwards he continued with being a presenter with the television network BNN. He was part of a group of presenters from the NPO 3-program, De Social Club. He also used his stage name Kraantje Pappie as presenter.

Discography

Albums 

|-
|align="left"|Crane||20-01-2012||28-01-2012||8||10||
|-
|align="left"|Crane II||21-03-2014||22-03-2014||13||3|| 
|-
|align="left"|Guardian van de Real Shit I|| 11-05-2015 || || || || 
|-
|align="left"|Guardian van de Real Shit II|| 11-05-2015 || || || || 
|-
|align="left"|Guardian van de Real Shit III|| 11-05-2015 || || || || 
|-
|align="left"|Crane III||28-10-2016||05-11-2016||22||84|| Gold 
|-
|align="left"|DADDY||28-09-2018||06-10-2018||2||54||
|}

{| class="wikitable sortable" style="font-size: 85%; text-align: center;"
|-
! rowspan="2" width="250" | Single title !! rowspan="2" width="100" data-sort-type="date" | Release date !! colspan="3" | Charting in the Ultratop 50 !! rowspan="2" | Comments
|-
! width="100" data-sort-type="date" | Date of entry !! data-sort-type="number" |  !! data-sort-type="number" | |-
|align="left"|Waar is Kraan?||06-02-2012||11-02-2012||16||16||
|-
|align="left"|Hoop nu||07-05-2012||16-06-2012||tip34||-||
|-
|align="left"|Semi bekend||08-10-2012||20-10-2012||tip15||-||
|-
|align="left"|Goud over shirt heen  (G.O.S.H.)||14-01-2013||26-01-2013||tip32||-||
|-
|align="left"|Koningslied||2013||11-05-2013||41||1|| as a part of the national committee inauguration
|-
|align="left"|Werkveld||01-07-2013||17-08-2013||tip88||-||
|-
|align="left"|Met z'n tweeën||29-11-2013||14-12-2013||tip8||-||
|-
|align="left"|Mijn nacht||26-05-2014||14-06-2014||tip57||-||
|-
|align="left"|Handen omhoog||2014||18-10-2014||tip44||-|| with Jan Smit
|-
|align="left"|Euro's||02-05-2016||14-05-2016||tip||-||
|-
|align="left"|Pompen||13-01-2017||11-02-2017||6||19||
|-
|align="left"|De manier||28-10-2016||17-06-2017||37||1|| feat. Bizzey
|-
|align="left"|Traag||12-05-2017||02-09-2017||tip27||-|| with Bizzey & Jozo
|-
|align="left"|Ja!||12-01-2018||20-01-2018||tip2||-|| with Bizzey, Chivv & Yung Felix
|-
|align="left"|Lil Craney||16-03-2018||07-04-2018||tip1||-||
|-
|align="left"|Allez||20-04-2018||28-04-2018||tip||-|| with Diggy Dex
|-
|align="left"|Liefde in de lucht||08-06-2018||16-06-2018||tip12||-|| feat. Joshua Nolet
|-
|align="left"|Ik heb je nodig||05-10-2018||08-12-2018||tip||-|| feat. Bizzey & Jonna Fraser
|-
|align="left"|DRUP||11-01-2019||19-01-2019||tip33||-|| with Bizzey, Jonna Fraser & Ramiks
|-
|align="left"|Last man standing||08-03-2019||16-03-2019||tip||-|| with Bizzey, Chivv & Yung Felix
|-
|align="left"|Vallende ster||06-09-2019||14-09-2019||tip||-|| 
|-
|align="left"|Getaway||01-11-2019||23-11-2019||tip31||-|| 
|-
|align="left"|Nacht||10-01-2020||18-01-2020||tip||-|| with Guus Meeuwis
|-
|align="left"|Rode wijn||20-03-2020||28-03-2020||tip||-|| with Maan
|-
|align="left"|Tranen||2021||13-03-2021||14||9||with Kris Kross Amsterdam & Pommelien Thijs
|}

References

1986 births
Dutch rappers
Dutch television presenters
People from Rozenburg
Living people